West Branch Township may refer to:

Iowa
 West Branch Township, Sioux County, Iowa, in Sioux County, Iowa

Kansas
 West Branch Township, Marion County, Kansas

Michigan
 West Branch Township, Dickinson County, Michigan
 West Branch Township, Marquette County, Michigan
 West Branch Township, Missaukee County, Michigan
 West Branch Township, Ogemaw County, Michigan

Pennsylvania
 West Branch Township, Potter County, Pennsylvania

See also
 West Branch (disambiguation)

Township name disambiguation pages